Robin Browne (born 26 May 1970) is a Guyanese cricketer. He played in two first-class and six List A matches for Guyana in 1995/96.

See also
 List of Guyanese representative cricketers

References

External links
 

1970 births
Living people
Guyanese cricketers
Guyana cricketers
Sportspeople from Georgetown, Guyana